Esme Young (February 1949) is an English fashion designer and television presenter. Since 2016, she has been a judge on the BBC reality series The Great British Sewing Bee.

Early life and education
Esme Young was the second of five children, siblings Fiona, Christopher, Angus and Jeremy. Her father, Brian Young, was South African and served in the RAF. Her mother, Patricia Young, née Cole, was a secretary.

Young attended the Convent of the Holy Ghost, Bedford, where she learnt to draw and sew. She later attended Central St Martins, at the time called Saint Martins School of Art, where she met fellow fashion designer Willie Walters.

In Season 8 episode 2 of The Great British Sewing Bee she revealed that her father was B P Young, captain of Wasps RFC in the 1950/51 season.

Career

Swanky Modes
In 1972, Young, along with fellow fashion designers Judy Dewsbury, Melanie Herberfield, and Willie Walters, founded a shop in Camden Town called Swanky Modes. Throughout the 1970s and 1980s Swanky Modes clothing appeared in Vogue, Nova, Honey and The Face. Their clothing was also photographed by Helmut Newton, David Bailey, Nick Knight, and John Swannell.

Film & Television
Young has made costumes for many films including The Beach, Bridget Jones' Diary, Romeo & Juliet and Trainspotting.
Since 2016, Young has been a judge on The Great British Sewing Bee. One of Young's most famous designs was the 'Amorphous Dress' worn by Linda Kozlowski in the 1986 movie Crocodile Dundee; a dress that is now in the V&A Collection.

In December 2022, she was a contestant on Richard Osman’s House of Games.

Other
She currently teaches at Central Saint Martins and is involved in a project called "Exploding Fashion" which highlights the importance of pattern cutting.

Young published her autobiography in 2022: Behind the Seams: My Life in Creativity, Friendship and Adventure from the star of the Great British Sewing Bee.

References 

1949 births
Living people
British women fashion designers
British women television presenters
English television presenters
Alumni of Central Saint Martins
English fashion designers
British autobiographers
Women autobiographers
Academics of Central Saint Martins